"Bliss" was a single from New Zealand band Th' Dudes from their album Where Are the Boys?. It was released in May 1980 and reached No. 25 on the New Zealand music charts. It has since become a cult New Zealand drinking song. In 2001 the song was voted by members of APRA as the 50th best New Zealand song of the 20th century and featured on the Nature's Best 2 CD.

Background
The song was written when the band were in Sydney, and so includes a number of references to Sydney landmarks. It was written as a satirical take on the drunken audiences the band had to play to, so there is some irony in that it has become a drinking song. The song began with the title 'piss' (for alcohol), but was changed after pressure from the record company.

Music video
The music video was recorded at The Cricketer's Arms in Wellington.

References

External links
 Music Video (NZOnScreen)

1980 songs
APRA Award winners
Th' Dudes songs
1980 singles
Songs written by Dave Dobbyn